The Stowers Institute for Medical Research is a biomedical research organization that conducts basic research on genes and proteins that control fundamental processes in living cells to analyze diseases and find keys to their causes, treatment, and prevention. It is located in Kansas City, Missouri adjacent to the University of Missouri–Kansas City main campus.

The Institute has spent over 1 billion $US on research.

Structure
The Institute was incorporated with an initial donation of $500 million in 1994 by James E. Stowers founder of American Century Investments and his wife Virginia Stowers, both cancer survivors. Over the next decade, the couple endowed the institute with gifts totaling almost $2 billion. The Institute opened its doors in November 2000 on the former site of Menorah Hospital. In 2008, there were 25 independent research programs plus core facilities in bioinformatics, proteomics, microarray, molecular biology, flow cytometry, and microscopy. In total, the organization employs more than 550 scientists, research associates, technicians and support staff, including more than 140 postdoctoral research associates and graduate students.

The Institute is recognized by the IRS as a medical research organization. It is a Missouri not-for-profit corporation, and is a 501(c)(3) charitable organization.

References

External links
Stowers Institute

Medical research institutes in the United States
Biomedical research foundations
Research institutes in Missouri
1994 establishments in Missouri
Organizations based in Kansas City, Missouri
Medical and health foundations in the United States